Dominik Greif (born 6 April 1997) is a Slovak professional footballer who plays as a goalkeeper for La Liga club RCD Mallorca and the Slovakia national team.

Club career

Slovan Bratislava
Greif made his professional debut for Slovan Bratislava against MFK Zemplín Michalovce on 13 May 2016.

During the 2018–19 season, Greif was the dominantly preferred goalkeeper over Michal Šulla, playing in 29 of the 32 games during the season.

Mallorca
On 6 July 2021, Greif joined newly promoted La Liga side Mallorca on a five-year deal.
Shortly after his arrival, he got plagued by various health problems. A muscle injury first sidelined him for a month after his arrival to Mallorca. Consequently, he had to fight an infection of his wisdom teeth. Finally, Greif got long-term sidelined by major chronic pain due to an unspecified illness not related to soccer. He was unable to practice for almost a year until doctors finally found the cause and appropriate treatment. Greif was able to come back and play in a competitive game in December 2022.

International career
While Greif was previously noted as a goalkeeper alternate in the Slovak senior national team nomination,  he was first called up to the national team on 25 May 2019 by Pavel Hapal. The nomination was for a double fixture in June - a home friendly against Jordan, to which, unusually, 29 players were called-up and a UEFA Euro 2020 qualifying fixture against Azerbaijan, played away on 11 June 2019. The squad was to be reduced to 23 players for the latter fixture. 

Greif made his debut against Jordan on 7 June 2019 in a 5–1 win at the Anton Malatinský Stadium in Trnava. He came on in the second half as a replacement for Matúš Kozáčik, with Slovakia losing 1–0. Greif maintained a clean sheet in the second half, yet only had to face few rather undangerous situations. Still, a surprise shot from Yousef Al-Rawashdeh made it past Greif, but had hit the bar. By the end of the year he was also capped in another friendly against Paraguay, which was a return game to the Tehelné pole stadium, after over ten years, when the old stadium from 1940s was demolished. Tehelné pole also happens to be the home stadium of Greif's then club, Slovan Bratislava. Greif's second game concluded with a tie 1–1. He conceded a goal from Kaku. Slovakia's goal was scored by Róbert Boženík. The game was also dubbed a farewell game for ex-captain Martin Škrtel, Tomáš Hubočan and Adam Nemec.

Career statistics

Club

International

Honours
Slovan Bratislava
Slovak First Football League: 2018–19, 2019–20, 2020–21
Slovak Cup: 2016–17, 2017–18, 2019–20, 2020–21

References

External links
 Profile at the RCD Mallorca website
 Futbalnet profile

1997 births
Living people
Footballers from Bratislava
Slovak footballers
Association football goalkeepers
Slovak Super Liga players
2. Liga (Slovakia) players
La Liga players
ŠK Slovan Bratislava players
RCD Mallorca players
Slovak expatriate footballers
Slovak expatriate sportspeople in Spain
Expatriate footballers in Spain
Slovakia youth international footballers
Slovakia under-21 international footballers
Slovakia international footballers